Daran Boonyasak or formerly Sinitta Boonyasak aka Noon (born June 5, 1979) is a Thai actress. She is the older sister of Laila Boonyasak and is best known for her role as Noi in Last Life in the Universe.

Filmography

 2003: Last Life in the Universe - Noi
 2006: Bite of Love - Bee (Mother) 2008: Wings of Blue Angel - Nuam
 2008: A Moment in June - Bride
 2009: Cupid's Love Ring - Oranee (Television)
 2010: Eternal Flame - Nari (Television)
 2011: Kohn Teun - Pada (Television)

Biography
She was first widely known in 1994 for playing the role of Fah, a nice lovely young woman in TV commercials for Mistine. This commercial is well-known because it is the first TV commercial in Thailand to be presented as a series, and also the official launch of Mistine, Thai cosmetic brand.

Sinitta's younger sister Laila is very famous in Thailand for her film work and modeling career. Around 2001 Sinitta decided to take an acting/directing course at Srinakharinwirot University, Prasarnmit Campus in Bangkok. It was there that she learned how to act without over-acting, like she had been doing in her previous 20-odd soap opera roles. She spent some time as a television host and was taking a Thai cooking class when she was approached by Pen-Ek Ratanaruang for the role of Noi in Last Life in the Universe, a role which kept her from quitting the film business altogether.

References
 Bangkok Etcetera'' interview by Lekha Shankar, 2003 (archived)

External links

1979 births
Living people
Daran Boonyasak
Daran Boonyasak
Daran Boonyasak
Daran Boonyasak
Daran Boonyasak